Mount Alice is a  mountain summit located in the Kenai Mountains, in the U.S. state of Alaska. The mountain's name was officially adopted in 1983 by the United States Geological Survey to honor Alice Lowell Scheffler (1879–1965), the daughter of Franklin G. Lowell, who with his family were the first homesteaders to settle the Seward area in 1883.

Climbing
The first ascent of the peak was made in 1963 by John Vincent Hoeman, David Johnston, and D. Hilt. The standard route is via the southwest face which entails steep snow and traditional  rock climbing.

Climate

Based on the Köppen climate classification, Mount Alice is located in a subarctic climate zone with long, cold, snowy winters, and mild summers. Temperatures can drop below −20 °C with wind chill factors below −30 °C. This climate supports a spruce and hemlock forest on the lower western slopes, and the massive Godwin Glacier on the eastern side of the mountain. May and June are the best months for climbing in terms of favorable weather.

See also

List of mountain peaks of Alaska
Geology of Alaska

References

Gallery

External links
 Mount Alice weather: Mountain Forecast
 "Alice" at 8:43 mark: YouTube
 Mount Alice summit view: YouTube

Alice
Alice
Alice
Alice